Ptyomaxia is a genus of snout moths. It was described by George Hampson in 1903.

Species
 Ptyomaxia amaura (Lower, 1902)
 Ptyomaxia fuscogrisella Ragonot, 1890
 Ptyomaxia metasarca (Lower, 1903)
 Ptyomaxia syntaractis (Turner, 1904)
 Ptyomaxia trigonifera Hampson, 1903
 Ptyomaxia trigonogramma (Turner, 1947)

References

Phycitini
Pyralidae genera